Dizmar may refer to:
Dizmar-e Gharbi Rural District
Dizmar-e Markazi Rural District
Dizmar-e Sharqi Rural District